Brie is a historic region of northern France notable in modern times for Brie cheese.  It was once divided into three sections ruled by different feudal lords: the western Brie française, corresponding roughly to the modern department of Seine-et-Marne in the Île-de-France region; the eastern Brie champenoise, forming a portion of the modern department of Marne in the historic region of Champagne (part of modern-day Grand Est); and the northern Brie pouilleuse, forming part of the modern department of Aisne in Picardy.

The surface soil is clay in which are embedded fragments of siliceous sandstone, used for millstones and constructional purposes; the subsoil is limestone.

Main towns:

 Brie-Comte-Robert
 Château-Thierry
 Coulommiers
 Crécy-la-Chapelle
 La Ferté-Gaucher
 La Ferté-sous-Jouarre
 Meaux
 Nangis
 Melun
 Provins

Main rivers:

 Marne
 Grand Morin
 Petit Morin

Main forests:

 Forêt d'Armainvilliers
 Forêt de Crécy-la-Chapelle
 Forêt de Ferrières
 Forêt de Notre-Dame
 Forest of Sénart
 Forêt de Villefermoy

External links 
 
 

Historical regions
Landforms of Seine-et-Marne
Landforms of Marne (department)
Former provinces of France
Plateaus of Metropolitan France